Paraleucobryum longifolium is a species of moss belonging to the family Dicranaceae.

It has almost cosmopolitan distribution.

References

Dicranales